Carlota D.d.R EspinoZa (born 1943, Denver, Colorado) is an American painter, muralist, and activist in her Art. She is one of the early Latina / Chicana muralists in Denver with works in Cuba, San Francisco, Texas, Arizona, and Colorado.

Early life and education 
Carlota D.d.R EspinoZa is the middle child of 14 siblings growing up first 8 years in Fraser, Colorado, and attended the Rocky Mountain School of the Arts in the 1960s and the University of Colorado Denver Metro. During the 1960s she participated in the Centro Cultural Center, organizing exhibitions for artists and was involved in the 1969 "Hispano Art Fiesta / Cinco de Mayo" events in Denver.

Career 
Early in her career, Carlota d.D.R EspinoZa painted two murals for the activist Rodolfo "Corky" Gonzales' Crusade for Justice center, one of which was destroyed in a 1973 fire after a bombing at the center. The surviving mural, Mexican Heros, painted in 1966, depicts Pancho Villa and Benito Juarez and was hung at the Crusade for Justice center.

EspinoZa is well known for her mural of La Guadalupe that is found on the altar of Our Lady of Guadalupe Catholic Church in Denver. She obtained permission to paint this work  from Pastor Jose Lara who claims to have told EspinoZa, "You don't have to have a picture of a perfect Lady of Guadalupe like in Mexico. Please paint a beautiful Chicana from north Denver." The mural, The Apparition of the Virgin Mary to Juan Diego in Mexico, was painted in 1976 and was on the altar until Father Benito Hernandez and church leadership had it removed it in 2010 under claims that the mural took away from the focus of the Holy presence. This removal stirred protests calling for the mural's return, including the gathering of 70 signatures for a letter to Denver Archbishop Charles Chaput demanding the murals restoration at the church, with EspinoZa agreeing to perform the restoration work if the church decides to remove the wall.

The mural, Pasado, Presente, Futuro is in the Byers branch of The Denver Public Library and "blends myth and reality, dream and truth. The past, present, future are one blood: Chicano!" This mural was commissioned by the Friends of the Denver Public Library in 1977 and included in the City of Denver Public Art collection.

Additionally, EspinoZa's screenprint We the People, Broken Treatys. from the National Chicano Screenprint Taller, 1988-1989, is held in the Smithsonian American Art Museum. She also worked as a background and forgound artist, She has two sculpture's at the Denver.Co.Library.She also worked at the Denver Museum of Natural History for 9 nine years.

EspinoZa is also known for her work as a Chicano activist using her "art to express those in need, especially the Chicano Latino communities in Colorado."

References 

Living people
1943 births
American women painters
Chicano
20th-century American painters
21st-century American painters
American muralists
Women muralists
American artists of Mexican descent
Hispanic and Latino American women in the arts
20th-century American women artists
21st-century American women artists
People from Grand County, Colorado
Painters from Colorado
University of Colorado Denver alumni
Activists from Colorado